Katalin Donáth (born 12 November 1979) is a Hungarian athlete. She competed in the women's pole vault at the 2000 Summer Olympics.

References

1979 births
Living people
Athletes (track and field) at the 2000 Summer Olympics
Hungarian female pole vaulters
Olympic athletes of Hungary
Athletes from Budapest
20th-century Hungarian women